Emil Rusu (born 26 December 1946) is a Romanian former cyclist. He competed at the 1964 Summer Olympics and the 1968 Summer Olympics.

References

External links
 

1946 births
Living people
Romanian male cyclists
Olympic cyclists of Romania
Cyclists at the 1964 Summer Olympics
Cyclists at the 1968 Summer Olympics